Track "X" Cemetery is a Commonwealth War Graves Commission burial ground for the dead of the First World War located near Ypres (Ieper) in Belgium on the Western Front.

The cemetery grounds were assigned to the United Kingdom in perpetuity by King Albert I of Belgium in recognition of the sacrifices made by the British Empire in the defence and liberation of Belgium during the war.

Foundation

The area where this cemetery now stands had been between the two front lines in June 1917. The area was captured and a cemetery was begun in July 1917 by the 39th and 48th (South Midland) Divisions. The cemetery closed in November 1917, although two more burials were made in May 1918.

Archaeological excavations have taken place in the immediate area, around Turco Farm trench, to uncover artifacts and historical details from the Great War.

References

External links
 
  Track X Cemetery at Find a Grave

Commonwealth War Graves Commission cemeteries in Belgium
Cemeteries and memorials in West Flanders